The American Party of the United States is a conservative political party in the United States. The party adheres to its Permanent Principles, which were established in 1969.

The party began as part of the American Independent Party, supporters of George Wallace's 1968 campaign for the presidency, and was the formal name of the party on the ballot in Tennessee. In 1969, the AIP became the American Party at a convention attended by representatives from 37 states. Following the 1972 election, the American Party formally split from the American Independent Party. Both parties have nominated candidates for the presidency and other offices, although the AIP has in more recent years considered itself a California affiliate of the Constitution Party. In New York, the American Party ran a state ticket in 1974 under the name of Courage Party, because a state law there prohibits the use of the word "American" on the ballot. The American Party won its strongest finish in the 1972 presidential election; nominee John G. Schmitz carried 1,090,673 votes (3rd place).

In 1990 some former members of the American party founded the Christian Party.

The American Party has failed to achieve ballot status in any state since 1996. The party's website disappeared sometime in 2008. In 2010 the Ohio party endorsed several Libertarian Party candidates.

The party had a Florida affiliate, the American Party of Florida, that appeared to carry on operations into June 2011, but became defunct after that and no longer is listed as a political party in Florida.

In 2015, the party created a new website; a Twitter account and Facebook page were also created. The American Party is now formally known as the "American Party of the United States", and disclaims any association with the "American Party of South Carolina", the "Independent American Party", or the "American Party of America".

Presidential and vice-presidential candidates
Electoral History of the American Party

Sources for table:
 Ohio Elects the President (2000), pp. 143–174.
 American Party history at OurCampaigns.com
 James T. Havel, U.S. Presidential Candidates and the Elections, vol. 2
 American Party website http://www.americanpartyofus.com/

See also

References

 Dennis, Delmar "The American Party" Contra Mundum Volume 4 (Summer 1992), pages 46–47.
 The American Party of the United States. americanpartyofus.com/
 A brief history can be found on ourcampaigns.com

External links
parties at politics.com
americanpartyofus.com on archive.org/
Ourcampaigns.com
Utah County American Party Collection; MSS 1708; 20th Century Western & Mormon Manuscripts; L. Tom Perry Special Collections, Harold B. Lee Library, Brigham Young University

1969 establishments in the United States
Far-right political parties in the United States
Paleoconservative parties in the United States
Political parties established in 1969
Political parties in the United States